|}

The West Yorkshire Hurdle is a Grade 2 National Hunt hurdle race in Great Britain that is open to horses aged four years or older. It is run at Wetherby, West Yorkshire, over a distance of about 3 miles (3 miles and 26 yards, or 4,852 metres), and during its running, there are twelve hurdles to be jumped. The race is scheduled to take place each year in late October or early November.

The event was established in 1990, and it was initially contested over 3 miles. It was extended to about 3 miles and 1 furlong (5,029 metres) in 1992. The race was sponsored by John Smith's from 2000 to 2012 and run as the John Smith's Hurdle. Since 2013, it has been sponsored by Bet365. It was reduced back to 3 miles in 2015.

Winners

See also
 Horse racing in Great Britain
 List of British National Hunt races

References
 Racing Post:
 

 pedigreequery.com – West Yorkshire Hurdle – Wetherby.

National Hunt races in Great Britain
Wetherby Racecourse
National Hunt hurdle races
Recurring events established in 1990
1990 establishments in England